Gujarat Fluorochemicals Limited (GFL) is an industrial refrigerant manufacturer in India. It is one of the largest producers (by volume) of chloromethane, refrigerants and polytetrafluoroethylene (PE).

History 
The company was incorporated in 1987, is a subsidiary of Inox Leasing and Finance Limited. GFL has two manufacturing facilities in Gujarat, a refrigerant plant at Ranjitnagar near Ghoghmba town Panchmahal, and a PTFE facility at Dahej. It has two subsidiaries - Gujarat Fluorochemicals Americas LLC and Gujarat Fluorochemicals GmbH to cater Americana and European operations respectively.

Controversies 
In 2000s, the company was embroiled in "shoddy practice" of destroying HFC 23, a byproduct released in the coolant-making process at its plant at Nathkuva village in Halol. In return, company was earning "lucrative" carbon credit. As per the 2010 Hindustan Times reporting, the company earned nearly half of its revenue for FY 2009-2010 from the sale of carbon credits.

Accidents 

 On December 16, 2021, 7 people died and 23 others were injured in a blast that took place at GFL's refrigerant manufacturing plant in Ranjitnagar village, Ghoghamba taluka of Panchmahal district.

References

External links 
 

Sortkey
Indian companies established in 1987
Sortkey
Sortkey
Sortkey
Chemical companies of India
Inox Group
1987 establishments in Uttar Pradesh
Companies listed on the National Stock Exchange of India
Companies listed on the Bombay Stock Exchange